Wilfred John O'Reilly  (born 22 August 1964 in Birmingham, Warwickshire - now West Midlands, England) is a British former short track speed skater. He won two gold medals at the 1988 Winter Olympics when short track speed skating was held as a demonstration sport. He was also the 1991 Overall World Champion. He is now coach of the Netherlands short track team.

Speed skating career
O'Reilly won two gold medals in the 500 metres and 1000 metres at the 1988 Winter Olympics in Calgary, but was denied full Olympic acclamation because short track speed skating was just a demonstration event that year. O'Reilly won the overall World Championship title in Sydney in 1991.

O'Reilly had a disastrous 1994 Olympics in Lillehammer where he crashed out of both the 500 metres and 1000 metres, protesting about being forced to race with a damaged blade.

He was honoured by TeamGB by being given the flag bearer role at the 1994 Olympics Closing Ceremony.

Commentating
O'Reilly commentated alongside Hugh Porter for BBC Sport on Speed skating at the Winter Olympics in both 2010 in Vancouver and 2014 in Sochi, and partnered Simon Brotherton in both 2018 in PyeongChang, and 2022 in Beijing.

Honours
O'Reilly was awarded the MBE in 1997. He is currently a member of the ISU Short Track Speed Skating World Cup Management Commission.

Personal life
O'Reilly was born in England to an African-American father and an Irish mother.

References

External links
 
Wilfred O'REILLY at ISU
Wilfred O'REILLY at the-sports.org

1964 births
Living people
British male short track speed skaters
Short track speed skaters at the 1988 Winter Olympics
Short track speed skaters at the 1992 Winter Olympics
Short track speed skaters at the 1994 Winter Olympics
Olympic short track speed skaters of Great Britain
Members of the Order of the British Empire
Universiade medalists in short track speed skating
Universiade silver medalists for Great Britain
Competitors at the 1991 Winter Universiade
English people of Irish descent
English people of African-American descent